The 2018–19 FA Women's National League Plate is the fifth running of the competition, which began in 2014. It is the secondary League Cup competition run by the FA Women's National League (FA WNL), and is run in parallel with the league's primary League Cup competition, the National League Cup.

The teams that take part in the WNL plate are decided after the determining round of the WNL Cup. The winners of determining round matches continue in the WNL Cup, while the losers move into the WNL Plate.

All 72 National League clubs were included in the determining round draw. St Nicholas withdrew from the competition before playing a match, meaning 36 teams progressed in the Cup and 35 were entered in the Plate.

West Ham United were the reigning champions, having defeated Luton Town 5–0 in the 2017–18 final, but did not defend their title after obtaining a licence to the FA Women's Super League.

Results
All results listed are published by The Football Association. Games are listed by round in chronological order, and then in alphabetical order of the home team where matches were played simultaneously.

The division each team play in is indicated in brackets after their name: (S)=Southern Division; (N)=Northern Division; (SW1)=South West Division One; (SE1)=South East Division One; (M1)=Midlands Division One; (N1)=Northern Division One.

First round
Due to there being 35 teams in the competition, three first round matches are played to eliminate three teams allowing a full single-elimination knockout tournament to take place.

Second round

Third round

Quarter-finals

Semi-finals

Final

Notes and references

Notes

References

FA Women's National League Plate
Prem